Erysiphe graminis f. sp. avenae is a plant pathogen of oats.

References

External links
 USDA ARS Fungal Database

Fungal plant pathogens and diseases
Oats diseases
graminis f. sp. avenae
Forma specialis taxa